Radim is a municipality and village in Jičín District in the Hradec Králové Region of the Czech Republic. It has about 400 inhabitants.

Administrative parts
Villages of Lháň, Podhájí, Studeňany and Tužín are administrative parts of Radim.

Notable people
Josef Váchal (1884–1969), writer and painter; lived and died here

References

Villages in Jičín District